Damien Derek Trotter (born 3 February 1991) is a fictional character in the BBC series Only Fools and Horses. He is son to Derek Trotter and Raquel Turner.

Damien is the only child of Del and Raquel and nephew of Rodney Trotter. A recurring theme in the show was Rodney's fixated belief that Damien was literally the Antichrist (an allusion to the Damien Thorn character from the Omen series of films) despite the fact that Damien shows no resentment nor intentions of harm toward anybody except Rodney himself.

Del and Raquel chide Rodney for his mad obsessions and believe Damien to be a perfect angel, spoiling him frequently. From the earliest ages, Damien shows signs of being a spoiled brat, such as throwing things at Rodney, throwing seeds on the floor, deliberately waking Uncle Albert up from a nap, placing Cassandra's birth control pills inside an urn containing Albert's ashes, urinating in a public swimming pool (from the top of the diving board), encouraging his father to physically fight someone at a funeral, and even hoping that his father might get sent to prison merely to fit in with his group of friends with imprisoned fathers. Although Del and Raquel seemed to remain oblivious to Damien's bad behaviour when he was younger, they did gradually become stricter with him in the final episodes and Rodney frequently calls him or refers to him as "Rap Boy" due to the way he dresses and acts.

He was named after Del and Raquel could not decide on a name for their unborn baby (Raquel thought of Aron, pronounced "air-on", but Uncle Albert thought the kids would nickname him "Aron a G-string" and Del thought Troy, but the name Troy Trotter was instantly dismissed), so Rodney sarcastically suggested that they name him "Damien" as Rodney was convinced that the baby would be born half-demon. To his horror, they adored the name and Rodney desperately tried to get them to change their minds, offering the name Derek which led to his middle name (and resulting in the initials D. D. T.) Damien was born under a full moon and during the birth, Rodney even went as so far as to ask Del if the baby had been born with the numbers "666" branded on its forehead.

After Damien was born, Rodney refused to hold him or share a room with him. In episodes when Damien was a child, Rodney seemed more relaxed around him but his fear arose again when Damien became a handsome and popular teenager who delighted in tormenting Rodney. Sometimes it became somewhat apparent that Del Boy enjoyed Rodney's fear of Damien, and on Rodney's birthday once, Damien "sent" him a card with the Devil on it. Cassandra shares Rodney's view that Damien is the Antichrist and like Rodney she is tormented by Damien (such as spying on her whilst she was showering and hiding her birth control pills in the urn containing Albert's ashes).

Family tree

References

Only Fools and Horses characters
Television characters introduced in 1991
Fictional English people
Child characters in television
Teenage characters in television
British male characters in television